Andreas Hollingen (born 3 October 1994) is a retired Norwegian footballer who played as a midfielder.

Career
Hollingen made his first-team debut for Molde in October 2012 in the Europa League against Steaua București. He later made his Norwegian Premier League debut in July 2013 in a 3–2 win against Tromsø.

On 10 August 2014, Hollingen joined HamKam on loan for the remainder of the season.

On 26 March 2015, Hollingen joined IK Start on a season-long loan. The loan was made permanent from the 2016-season. He left the club at the end of the 2018 season.

Hollingen fought with injuries in four years and never played professionally again since leaving IK Start at the age of 24 in December 2018.

Later career
From August 2019 to February 2020, he worked as a youth coach at Frigg Oslo FK. Later in 2020, Hollingen was hired as a physical coach for KFUM Oslo's Norwegian First Division team.

Career statistics

References

1994 births
Living people
People from Molde
Norwegian footballers
Norway youth international footballers
Molde FK players
Hamarkameratene players
IK Start players
Eliteserien players
Norwegian First Division players
Association football midfielders
Sportspeople from Møre og Romsdal